The Aulihan are a Somali clan, a division of the Ogaden clan, living on both sides of the Kenya - Somalia border. The majorities migrated in response to pressure from the expanding Ethiopian empire and had taken control of the hinterland of the lower Jubba river by the 1870s. The Aulihan today hold the middle Jubba Valley areas north of Gelib. Their grazing territory extends across the border into Kenya, and they claim a large part of northeastern Garissa District. They are active in the cross-border cattle trade. In 1984 there was little rain. In search of grazing, Aulihan from Garissa District pushed into Isiolo District where they started to push the Boran people from their pasturage and to raid their herds.

In December 1915, the Aulihan raided some Samburu who had taken their herds into the Lorian Swamp, stealing several thousand cattle. The British, preoccupied with military operations against the Germans in German East Africa, were slow to respond. After their post at Sarinley in Jubaland was sacked, the British withdrew from their other posts in the northeast frontier region of the East African Protectorate. The Aulihan attempted to get other clans involved in their struggle against the colonialists, but were not successful. Eventually, in September 1917 the British sent an expedition that re-occupied Serenli, and followed up with successful operations against the northern Aulihan who capitulated on 15 January 1918. Further ruthless operations against southern Aulihan were completed in March 1918.

In the late 1980s the Aulihan, Mohamed Zubeyr and other Ogadeen clansmen had formed the Somali Patriotic Movement (SPM), taking control of the Lower Jubba. In the mid-1990s there was a split within the Ogadeen, with the Aulihan led by General Nur Gebiyo joining with General Hersi Morgan's Harti-based faction of the SPM.The strongest sub clan of the Ogaden  By 2000,  Senior Olow

Subclans
Aulyahan branches to nine sub clans which is divided into three categories
 1. Mumin Hassan
Afgaab
Wafate
Aden kheyr
 2. Tur Cade
Hawis
Abokor Cade
Sonqaad
 3. Abobakr
 Ali
Afwaax
Qasin

References

Sources

 
 
 
 

Ogaden (clan)
Garissa County
Somali clans